China National Highway 352 is a partially completed highway in China. The highway runs from Zhangjiajie in Henan to Qiaojia County in Yunnan. The highway crosses through the provinces of Hunan, Guizhou, Sichuan, and Yunnan.

References

352
Transport in China
Transport in Hunan
Transport in Guizhou
Transport in Sichuan
Transport in Yunnan